The World Plumbing Council (WPC) is an international organization  of plumbing associations and plumbing industry participants . There are currently over 200 WPC members from more than 30 countries around the world.

Information
World Plumbing Day is an international event on March 11 every year, initiated by the WPC as a means of highlighting the important role plumbing plays in the health, safety and sustainability of our community.

The WPC hosts the World Plumbing Conference once every three years. The last conference was in September 2019 in Melbourne, Australia.

References

External links

Industrial Plumbing

Plumbing
Organisations based in Zürich
International professional associations